The 1966 Oklahoma gubernatorial election was held on November 8, 1966, and was a race for Governor of Oklahoma. Republican Dewey F. Bartlett defeated Democrat Preston J. Moore and Independent H. E. Ingram. John Newbold Camp unsuccessfully sought the Republican nomination, while Raymond D. Gary, David Hall, and Charles R. Nesbitt unsuccessfully sought the Democratic nomination.

Results

References

1966
Gubernatorial
Okla
November 1966 events in the United States